The Same Sky may refer to:

 The Same Sky (play), a 1951 play by Yvonne Mitchell set in London during The Blitz, televised in 1953
 The Same Sky (TV series), a 2017 German TV series set in Berlin during the Cold War

See also
 Under the Same Sky (disambiguation)